This is a list of Juventus F.C. players who have earned 100 or more caps for Juventus.

For a list of the Juventus players, major or minor, see Juventus F.C. players. For statistics and records see the statistics and records related article. For the list of Juventus players who played with the Italy national team during their careers at Juventus, see the Juventus F.C. and the Italy national team article. For the current squad and its notable players, see the main Juventus F.C. article.

List of players 
Players with 100 or more appearances for the club are listed in alphabetical order according to the date of their first-team official debut for the club. Appearances and goals are for all first-team competitive matches. Substitute appearances included. Bold denotes current Juventus players.

Statistics correct as of 19 January 2023.

Club captains 

The role of captain in Italian football made its first appearance in the early 1920s.

List of Juventus players to have won all three major UEFA club competitions 

The table below shows the Juventus players who have won all three major UEFA club competitions (chronological order).

Source: Players regarding European Club Cups, Record Sport Soccer Statistics Foundation, rsssf.com.

List of Juventus' players to have won all UEFA club competitions 

The table below show the Juventus players who have won all UEFA club competitions (chronological order).

Source: Players regarding European Club Cups, Record Sport Soccer Statistics Foundation, rsssf.com.

See also 
 Lega Calcio Serie A-winning players
 Juventus F.C. and the Italy national football team

Footnotes and references

Bibliography

External links 
 Champions of the past: History of Juventus FC players and managers (bianconerionline.com) 
 Statistic Area – All Juventus FC players since 1900 (juword.net) 
 Juventus Story: more than 100 years of Juve (juvecentus.too.it) 

players
 
Juventus
Association football player non-biographical articles